Xu Xiaonian (born 1953) is Professor of Economics and Finance at China Europe International Business School, named by Businessweek as one of China's Most Powerful People in 2009.  From 1981 to 1985, he worked at Center of Development and Research, State Council of the People's Republic of China as Research Fellow.  He got Doctor of Economics at University of California, Davis in 1991.  From 1991 to 1995, he worked as assistant professor at Amherst College.

References

Living people
1953 births
People's Republic of China economists
University of California, Davis alumni
Xi'an Jiaotong University alumni
Renmin University of China alumni
Amherst College faculty
People from Hefei
Economists from Anhui
Educators from Anhui